Windpark Egmond aan Zee (OWEZ) is the first large scale offshore wind farm built off the Dutch North Sea coast. The wind park is owned by Shell. It consists of 36 Vestas V90-3MW wind turbines, each with nameplate capacity of 3 MW. In total the farm has a capacity of 108 MW. Together these are scaled to provide energy for a maximum of 100,000 households.

Location and size
Size of the farm is a projected . It was built by a consortium of Ballast Nedam and wind turbine manufacturers Vestas. The facility is being refurbished in 2021.

Gallery

See also

List of Offshore Wind Farms
List of offshore wind farms in the North Sea
Princess Amalia Wind Farm
Wind power in the Netherlands
Renewable energy in the Netherlands

References

External links
Windpark Egmond aan Zee / NoordZeeWind Official website
, showing the construction
LORC Knowledge - Datasheet for Egmond Aan Zee

Offshore wind farms in the North Sea
Wind farms in the Netherlands
Energy infrastructure completed in 2007
2007 establishments in the Netherlands
21st-century architecture in the Netherlands